Schopenhauer's criticism of Kant's schemata is part of Schopenhauer's criticism of the Kantian philosophy which was published in 1819. In the appendix to the first volume of his main work, The World as Will and Representation, Arthur Schopenhauer attempted to assign the psychological cause of Kant's doctrines of the categories and their schemata. Schopenhauer's analysis holds that Kant misused argument by analogy to connect abstract reasoning to empirical perception; Schopenhauer argues that this comparison is baseless, and that its conclusions are thus invalid.

In his 1909 book Kant's Philosophy as Rectified by Schopenhauer, Michael Kelly drew attention to Schopenhauer's discussion of Kant's Schemata. In his Preface, Dr. Kelly justified his book by saying: "...a short exposition of Transcendental Idealism with Schopenhauer's constructive and destructive criticism may be of use to those that cannot make a simultaneous study of Kant and Schopenhauer in the original. To think that the former [Kant] can be understood without the latter [Schopenhauer] is a fatal delusion. If anybody should doubt this, let him try to make out what Kant meant by the ' Schematismus,' and he will soon find it advisable to avail himself of the assistance of a man who is worth ten times more than all the post-Kantian philosophers and professors put together."

In Chapter XI, Kelly provided a condensation of Schopenhauer's explanation of Kant's false analogy between empirical and pure cognitions:
Having sought to find an a priori cognitive faculty corresponding to every empirical [a posteriori] one, Kant remarked that, in order to make sure that we are not leaving the solid ground of perception, we often refer back from the empirical [a posteriori] abstract idea [concept] to the latter [the perception]. The temporary representative of the idea [concept] thus called forth, and which is never fully adequate to it, he calls a 'schema,' in contradistinction to the complete image. He now maintains that, as such a schema stands between the empirical [a posteriori] idea [concept] and the clear sensual perception, so also similar ones stand between the a priori perceptive faculty of the sensibility and the a priori thinking faculty of the pure understanding. To each category, accordingly, corresponds a special schema. But Kant overlooks the fact that, in the case of the empirically [a posteriori] acquired ideas [concepts], we refer back to the perception from which they have obtained their content, whereas the a priori ideas [concepts], which have as yet no content, come to the perception from within [cognition] in order to receive something from it. They have, therefore, nothing to which they can refer back, and the analogy [of the a priori schema] with the empirical [a posteriori] schema falls to the ground. 

According to Schopenhauer's psychological hypothesis, Kant "... aimed at finding for every empirical function of the faculty of knowledge an analogous a priori function ... ." Kant's tacit reasoning was similar to the following: "If pure intuition is the foundation of empirical intuition, then pure concepts are the foundation of empirical concepts."  From this symmetrical analogy, Kant claimed that the human mind has a pure understanding, just as he had previously claimed that the mind has a pure sensibility. This pure understanding, according to Kant, consists of pure concepts or categories which allow the mind to discursively [verbally] think about the objects that are intuitively perceived as being arranged in time and space.

Kant wrote that "To demonstrate the reality of our concepts, intuitions are required."   Since empirical concepts are derived from perceptions, examples of the intuitive perceptions can be used to verify the concept. Kant asserted that pure concepts, or categories of the understanding, can also be verified by inspecting their intuitions or schemata. "If the concepts are empirical, the intuitions are called examples: if they are pure concepts of the understanding, the intuitions are called schemata." 

Schopenhauer described the use of examples in the following way:

Notes

References
 Kant, Immanuel, Critique of Pure Reason
 Kant, Immanuel, Critique of Judgment
 Kelly, Michael, Kant's Philosophy as Rectified by Schopenhauer
 Schopenhauer, Arthur, The World as Will and Representation, Vol. I, Appendix, "Criticism of the Kantian Philosophy", 1969, Dover, 

Criticism of Immanuel Kant
Schopenhauer
Criticisms